Mettmenhaslisee is a lake located between Niederhasli and Mettmenhasli in the Canton of Zurich, Switzerland.

Lakes of Switzerland
Lakes of the canton of Zürich